The Kunstmuseum Basel houses the oldest public art collection in the world and is generally considered to be the most important museum of art in Switzerland. It is listed as a heritage site of national significance.

Its lineage extends back to the Amerbach Cabinet, which included a collection of works by Hans Holbein purchased by the city of Basel and the University of Basel in 1661, which made it the first municipally owned and therefore open to the public museum in the world. Its collection is distinguished by an impressively wide historic span, from the early 15th century up to the immediate present. Its various areas of emphasis give it international standing as one of the most significant museums of its kind. These encompass: paintings and drawings by artists active in the Upper Rhine region between 1400 and 1600, and on the art of the 19th to 21st centuries.

Collection
The Kunstmuseum possesses the largest collection of works by the Holbein family. Further examples of Renaissance art include important pieces by such masters as Konrad Witz, Hans Baldung (called Grien), Martin Schongauer, Lucas Cranach the Elder and Matthias Grünewald. The main features of the 17th and 18th centuries are the Flemish and Dutch schools (e.g. Peter Paul Rubens, Rembrandt, Jan Brueghel the Elder), German and Dutch still life painting. Key works from the 19th century include the Impressionists represented by Édouard Manet, Edmond Jean de Pury, Claude Monet, Paul Gauguin, Paul Cézanne as well as the paintings by Vincent van Gogh and Switzerland's Arnold Böcklin and Ferdinand Hodler. In the 20th century, the focus is on works of Cubism with Picasso, Braque and Juan Gris. Expressionism is represented by such figures as Edvard Munch, Franz Marc, Oskar Kokoschka and Emil Nolde. The collection also includes works from Constructivism, Dadaism and Surrealism and American art since 1950. Further highlights are the unique compilations of works from Pablo Picasso, Fernand Léger, Paul Klee, Alberto Giacometti and Marc Chagall.

In the realm of more recent and contemporary art, the collection maintains substantial bodies of work by Swiss, German, Italian, and American artists, including Joseph Beuys, Andy Warhol, Jasper Johns, Georg Baselitz, A.R. Penck, Brice Marden, Bruce Nauman, Jonathan Borofsky, Roni Horn, Francesco Clemente, Mimmo Paladino, Enzo Cucchi, Martin Disler, Leiko Ikemura, Markus Raetz, Rosemarie Trockel and Robert Gober.

History 

In 1671 the city of Basel decided to make the art collection of the Amerbach cabinet accessible to the public. The collection was exhibited in the  near the Munster of Basel and could be accessed by the public twice a week. In 1823 the public collection was joined with the before private Faesch Museum established by Remigius Faesch and in 1849 the collection moved into a larger building also near the Munster of Basel. In 1859, a new building for the museum was thought of, inspired by the paintings the Swiss painter Emilie Linder had annually deposited in the museum since 1847. The museum at the included several other academic departments. A move was seen to give the art collection more room and also enable an efficient rescue of the paintings in case of a fire. Until 1864 the museum included a department on physical and chemical departments. In 1866, also the ethnographic and antiquarian departments were moved to another location following which the artworks received two more prominent rooms. §In 1936 the Museum moved to the current location.

In the year of 1939 a large body of work by German-Jewish artists, whose paintings were considered to be degenerate art by the Nazi regime in Germany could be saved by the Kunstmuseum, were brought to Switzerland and are on display in the museum up to this day. In 1980 the Museum joined forces with the Museum for Contemporary Art, which displays artworks from the 1960s onwards. It was the first museum focused on contemporary art at the time.

Buildings

The Kunstmuseum's current and main building was designed and constructed 1931-1936 by architects Paul Bonatz and Rudolf Christ, adjacent to the former building of the Swiss National Bank in Basel. In 1980, a building beside the Rhine in the St. Alban neighborhood was added as an additional location of the Kunstmuseum.

In 2008, the museum acquired land on the other side of Dufourstrasse and an architectural competition was held. With international star competitors, such as five Pritzker Prize laureates (Peter Zumthor, Zaha Hadid, Rafael Moneo, Tadao Ando and Jean Nouvel)  — all pitching, eventually a young local firm, Christ & Gantenbein, won the project. The final design is an angled building, faced with concrete bricks, and at the same height as the original museum. The new building is joined with the main building through an underpass.

The new building was completed in April 2016 and its construction was funded by the Canton of Basel-Stadt and the Laurenz Foundation (Laurenz-Stiftung).

The extension adds 2,750 square meters of galleries, to a total of nearly 10,000 square meters. The original museum now houses art from the 15th century to 1950, with later works in the extension. The upper floor of the new building houses temporary exhibitions and the middle floor and part of the ground floor the permanent collection.

Visitors
In 2019, the Kunstmuseum had 265,000 visitors.

Gallery

See also 
 Raoul Albert La Roche, Swiss art collector and donator
 Louise Bachofen-Burckhardt, Swiss art collector and donator

References

External links 

Kunstmuseum Basel website
Basel museums website
 List of paintings in collection

1661 establishments in Europe
17th-century establishments in Switzerland
Art museums and galleries in Switzerland
Art museums established in 1661
Cultural property of national significance in Basel-Stadt
Museums in Basel